Siegrist may refer to:

August Siegrist (1865–1947), Swiss ophthalmologist
Beatrice Siegrist (born 1934), French composer
Benjamin Siegrist (born 1992), Swiss football goalkeeper
Nico Siegrist (born 1991), football striker
Theo H. Siegrist, professor

See also
Siegrist streaks, rare manifestation of hypertensive choroidopathy
Siegrist's Mill Covered Bridge, covered bridge that spanned the Big Chiques Creek in Lancaster County, Pennsylvania, United States

Surnames of German origin